Alexander Leonidovich Andrijevsky (born August 10, 1968) is a Belarusian former professional ice hockey player who played one game in the National Hockey League for the Chicago Blackhawks. He is currently the head coach for Admiral Vladivostok of the Kontinental Hockey League (KHL).

Playing career
Andrijevsky spent the first six seasons of his career with his hometown team Dinamo Minsk between 1984 and 1990. In 1991, he moved to Dynamo Moscow. 1991 was also the year Andrijevski was drafted by the Chicago Blackhawks, who selected him 220th overall in the 10th round. After one more season with Dynamo, Andrijevsky moved to North America, signing with the Blackhawks. For the 1992-93 season, he was assigned to the Indianapolis Ice of the International Hockey League before being called up by the Blackhawks for his only NHL game.

The next season, Andrijevsky played just four games for Indianapolis before moving to the Kalamazoo Wings in the same league. It would be his final year in North America as he moved to the SM-liiga in Finland, joining HPK where he spent four seasons. He then split the 1998-99 season playing in Italian Hockey League - Serie A in Italy for HC Bolzano and in the Deutsche Eishockey Liga in Germany for the Krefeld Pinguine. Following a spell in the 2nd Bundesliga for EHC Neuwied, He returned to the DEL with Revierlöwen Oberhausen for two seasons.

Andrijevsky returned to Russia in 2001 with Khimik Voskresensk of the Vysshaya Hokkeinaya Liga, the country's second-tier league. He later returned to the 2nd Bundesliga with EHC Freiburg before returning to Belarus with HK Gomel and a return to Dinamo Minsk to finish his career.

International career
Andrijevsky was a member of the Belarus national team and played with the team in the 1998 and 2002 Winter Olympics. He also represented the team in four Ice Hockey World Championships.

Career statistics

Regular season and playoffs

International

External links

1968 births
Living people
Belarusian ice hockey coaches
Belarusian ice hockey right wingers
Bolzano HC players
Chicago Blackhawks draft picks
Chicago Blackhawks players
HC Dinamo Minsk players
HC Dynamo Moscow players
EHC Freiburg players
HC Fribourg-Gottéron players
HK Gomel players
HPK players
Ice hockey players at the 1998 Winter Olympics
Ice hockey players at the 2002 Winter Olympics
Indianapolis Ice players
Kalamazoo Wings (1974–2000) players
HC Khimik Voskresensk players
Krefeld Pinguine players
HK Neman Grodno players
Olympic ice hockey players of Belarus
Revier Löwen players
Soviet ice hockey right wingers
Ice hockey people from Minsk
Tivali Minsk players
Belarusian expatriate sportspeople in the United States
Belarusian expatriate sportspeople in Switzerland
Belarusian expatriate sportspeople in Finland
Belarusian expatriate sportspeople in Italy
Belarusian expatriate sportspeople in Germany
Belarusian expatriate sportspeople in Russia
Expatriate ice hockey players in the United States
Expatriate ice hockey players in Switzerland
Expatriate ice hockey players in Finland
Expatriate ice hockey players in Italy
Expatriate ice hockey players in Germany
Expatriate ice hockey players in Russia
Belarusian expatriate ice hockey people